Nonja is the name of two orangutans: 

Nonja (Malaysian orangutan), the orangutan with the longest known lifespan
Nonja (Austrian orangutan), an orangutan residing at the Vienna Zoo